A phosphoribosyltransferase is a type of transferase enzyme.

Types include:
Adenine phosphoribosyltransferase
Hypoxanthine-guanine phosphoribosyltransferase
Orotate phosphoribosyltransferase
Quinolinate phosphoribosyltransferase
Uracil phosphoribosyltransferase

Transferases